The second European Parliament election by direct universal suffrage, took place in June 1984. The citizens of nine countries elected overall 518 MEPs for a term of five years.

In 1986, the accession of Spain and Portugal meant the addition of new members from those countries.

MEPs by Country 
MEPs for Belgium 1984–1989
MEPs for Denmark 1984–1989
MEPs for France 1984–1989
MEPs for Greece 1984–1989
MEPs for Ireland 1984–1989
MEPs for Italy 1984–1989
MEPs for Luxembourg 1984–1989
List of members of the European Parliament for the Netherlands, 1984–1989
MEPs for Portugal 1987–1989
MEPs for Spain 1987–1989
MEPs for the UK 1984–1989
MEPs for West Germany 1984–1989

A 

 Jean-Pierre Abelin
 Victor Abens
 Carlos Aboim
 Gordon Adam
 Dimitrios Adamou
 Jochen van Aerssen
 Heinrich Aigner
 Alexandros Alavanos
 Siegbert Alber
 Jean-Marie Alexandre
 Manuel Almeida
 Giorgio Almirante
 José María Álvarez de Eulate
 José Álvarez de Paz
 Giuseppe Amadei
 Rui Amaral
 Werner Amberg
 Georgios Anastassopoulos
 Hedy d'Ancona
 Ettore Andenna
 Anne André-Léonard
 Niall Andrews
 Magdeleine Anglade
 Dario Antoniozzi
 Bernard Antony
 Víctor Manuel Arbeloa
 Pedro Argüelles
 Miguel Arias Cañete
 Rudi Arndt
 Evangelos Averoff-Tositsas
 Paraskevas Avgerinos

B 

 Jean-Paul Bachy
 Monique Badénes
 Gianni Baget Bozzo
 Louis Baillot
 Richard A. Balfe
 Francisco Pinto Balsemão
 Juan María Bandrés
 Mary Elizabeth Banotti
 Carla Barbarella
 Otto Bardong
 Enrique Barón
 Carlos Barral
 Sylvester Barrett
 José Barros
 Roberto Barzanti
 Robert Batailly
 Robert C. Battersby
 Dominique Baudis
 Denis Baudouin
 Charles E. Baur
 Bernardo Bayona
 Christopher Beazley
 Peter Beazley
 Hans-Joachim Beckmann
 Luis Filipe Pais Beirôco
 Maria Belo
 Carlos Manuel Bencomo
 Gérard Benhamou
 Pierre Bernard-Reymond
 Giovanni Bersani
 Jean Besse
 The Lord Nicholas Bethell
 Vincenzo Bettiza
 Bouke Beumer
 Luc Ch. H. Beyer de Ryke
 John A. W. Bird
 Philipp von Bismarck
 Birgit Bjørnvig
 Undine-Uta Bloch von Blottnitz
 Roland Blum
 Erik Bernhard Blumenfeld
 Gisèle Bochenek-Forray
 Reinhold L. Bocklet
 Jørgen Bøgh
 Alfons Boesmans
 Alain Bombard
 Aldo Bonaccini
 Jens-Peter Bonde
 Emma Bonino
 Margherita Boniver
 Elise C. A. M. Boot
 Franco Borgo
 Bodil Boserup
 Ioannis Boutos
 Ursula Braun-Moser
 Georges de Brémond d'Ars
 Jürgen Brinckmeier
 José António Brito
 Elmar Brok
 Beata Ann Brookes
 Paulin-Christian Bruné
 Carlos María Bru
 Janey O'Neil Buchan
 Hubert Jean Buchou
 José Miguel Bueno
 Martine Buron
 Antonino Buttafuoco

C 

Esteban Caamaño
Pío Cabanillas Gallas
Jesús Cabezón
José Cabrera Bazan
Rafael Calvo
Leopoldo Calvo-Sotelo
Michel de Camaret
Jorge Campinos
Eusebio Cano
Antonio Nicola Cantalamessa
Manuel Cantarero
Alain Carignon
Angelo Carossino
José Vicente Carvalho
Carlo Casini
Jean-Pierre Cassabel
Maria Luisa Cassanmagnago Cerretti
Brian M. D. Cassidy
Luciana Castellina
Barbara A. Castle
Sir Fred Catherwood
Marco Cellai
José Emilio Cervera
Giovanni Cervetti
Dominique Chaboche
Robert Chambeiron
Raphaël M. G. Chanterie
Mauro Chiabrando
Roger Chinaud
Vittorino Chiusano
Louis Chopier
Nicole Chouraqui
Ib Christensen
Ejner Hovgård Christiansen
Efthymios Christodoulou
Michelangelo Ciancaglini
Roberto Cicciomessere
Maria Lisa Cinciari
Mark Clinton
José Coderch
Robert Cohen
António Antero Coimbra
Juan Luis Colino
Michel Collinot
Kenneth D. Collins
Joan Colom
Michele Columbu
Francesco Compasso
Fernando Condesso
Petrus A. M. Cornelissen
Roberto Costanzo
Alfred Coste-Floret
Jean-Pierre Cot
Richard J. Cottrell
John de Courcy Ling
Baroness Christine M. Crawley
Rodolfo Crespo
Lambert V. J. Croux
Jean E. Crusol
George Robert Cryer
David M. Curry

D 

Joachim Dalsass
Margaret E. Daly
Pieter Dankert
Rika M. R. De Backer
Michel Debatisse
Karel De Gucht
Antonio Del Duca
Robert Delorozoy
Danielle De March-Waller
Ciriaco De Mita
Jean-François Deniau
Pancrazio De Pasquale
Gérard Deprez
Stéphane Dermaux
Claude J.-M. J. Desama
Dimitrios Dessylas
Gilbert Devèze
Gijs M. de Vries
August M. C. De Winter
Ramón Díaz del Río
Mario Di Bartolomei
Mario Didò
Carmen Díez de Rivera
Nel B. M. van Dijk
Chrysanthos Dimitriadis
Aristides Dimopoulos
Georges H. Donnez
The Lord Douro
José Manuel Duarte
Daniel Ducarme
Bárbara Dührkop
Peter Klaus Duetoft
Anne-Marie Dupuy
Emilio Duran
Josep Antoni Duran i Lleida
Raymonde M. E. A. Dury

E 

Manfred Artur Ebel
The Baroness Elles
James Elles
Michael N. Elliott
Vassilis Ephremidis
Sergio Ercini
Arturo Juan Escuder
José Antonio Escudero
Nicolas Estgen
Rafael Estrella
Dimitrios Evrigenis
Winifred M. Ewing
Louis Eyraud

F 

Sheila Faith
Roger Fajardie
Alexander C. Falconer
Guido Fanti
André Fanton
Léon Fatous
Ludwig Fellermaier
António José Fernandes
Basil de Ferranti
Concepció Ferrer
Bruno Ferrero
Ove Fich
António Jorge de Figueiredo Lopes
Konstantinos Filinis
Gene Fitzgerald
Jim Fitzsimons
Seán Flanagan
Colette Flesch
Elena Flores
Gaston Flosse
Katharina Focke
Nicole Fontaine
Glyn Ford
Roberto Formigoni
André Fourçans
Manuel Fraga
Otmar Franz
Bruno Friedrich
Ingo Friedrich
Isidor W. Früh
Yvette M. Fuillet

G 

Colette Gadioux
Gerardo Gaibisso
Yves A. R. Galland
Max Gallo
Carlo Alberto Galluzzi
José Augusto Gama
Juan Antonio Gangoiti
Carlos Garaikoetxea
Vasco Garcia
Manuel García Amigo
Ludivina García
Antonio Garcia-Pagan
José Luis García Raya
Salvador Garriga Polledo
Carles-Alfred Gasòliba
Natalino Gatti
Roger Gauthier
Fritz Gautier
Jas Gawronski
Nikolaos Gazis
Kyriakos Gerontopoulos
Marietta Giannakou
Giovanni Giavazzi
Vincenzo Giummarra
Emmanouil Glezos
Ernest Glinne
Roland Goguillot
Fernando Gomes
Friedrich-Wilhelm Graefe zu Baringdorf
Jacqueline Grand
Carlo Alberto Graziani
Eva Gredal
Maxime François Gremetz
Winston James Griffiths
Julián Grimaldos
Anselmo Guarraci
Guy Jean Guermeur
Julén Guimon
Antoni Gutiérrez

H 

Otto von Habsburg
Wolfgang Hackel
Klaus Hänsch
Benedikt Härlin
Wilhelm F. T. Hahn
Else Hammerich
José H. G. Happart
Brigitte Heinrich
Fernand H. J. Herman
José Ramón Herrero Merediz
Robert Hersant
Ien van den Heuvel
Michael J. Hindley
Rüdiger Hitzigrath
Magdalene Hoff
Jacqueline Hoffmann
Karl-Heinz Hoffmann
Geoffrey W. Hoon
Paul F. Howell
Leslie J. Huckfield
Stephen Hughes
Jean-Paul Hugot
John Hume
Alasdair Henry Hutton

I 

Antonio Iodice
Felice Ippolito
John Iversen

J 

Caroline Jackson
Christopher Murray Jackson
Erhard V. Jakobsen
James L. Janssen van Raay
Marie Jepsen
Lionel Jospin
Alain Juppé

K 

Edward Kellett-Bowman
Michael L. Kilby
Mark Killilea Jnr
Egon A. Klepsch
Jan Klinkenborg
Michael Klöckner
Spiridon Kolokotronis
Frode Kristoffersen
Willy H. G. J. M. Kuijpers
Leonidas Kyrkos

L 

Antonio Augusto Lacerda
José María Lafuente López
Leonidas Lagakos
Patrick Joseph Lalor
Panayotis Lambrias
Horst Langes
Jessica E. S. Larive
Pierre Lataillade
Jean A. F. Lecanuet
Jean-Marie Le Chevallier
Olivier Lefevre d'Ormesson
Martine Lehideux
Bram van der Lek
Eileen Lemass
Gerd Ludwig Lemmer
Marcelle Lentz-Cornette
Marlene Lenz
Jean-Marie Le Pen
Marie-Noëlle Lienemann
Giosuè Ligios
Salvatore Lima
Rolf Linkohr
Anne-Marie A. Lizin
Carmen Llorca Vilaplana
César Llorens
Alfred Lomas
Gérard Longuet
Charles-Emile Loo
Hendrik J. Louwes
Francisco Lucas Pires
Zenon-José Luis
Rudolf Luster
Finn Lynge

M 

John Joseph McCartin
Giulio Maceratini
Michael McGowan (politician)
Hugh McMahon
Edward McMillan-Scott
Ray MacSharry
Luís Filipe Madeira
Emmanuel P. M. Maffre-Baugé
Thomas Joseph Maher
Hanja Maij-Weggen
Kurt Malangré
Philippe Malaud
Christian de La Malène
Jacques Mallet
Jean-François Mancel
Georges Marchais
Pol M. E. E. Marck
Francesca Marinaro
Luís Marinho
Alain Marleix
António Marques Mendes
António José Marques Mendes
John Leslie Marshall
Claudio Martelli
David Martin (Scottish politician)
Simone M. M. Martin
Renato Massari
Vincenzo Mattina
Georgios Mavros
Sylvie Mayer
Federico Mayor
José Manuel Medeiros Ferreira
Manuel Medina
Thomas Megahy
Meinolf Mertens
Alman Metten
Alberto Michelini
Karl-Heinrich Mihr
Joaquim Miranda
Ana Miranda de Lage
Alfeo Mizzau
Poul Møller
Emilio Molinari
Andoni Monforte
José María Montero
James Moorhouse
Fernando Morán
Alberto Moravia
Raúl Morodo
Giovanni Moroni
David Morris
Didier Motchane
Jean Mouchel
Ernest Mühlen
Günther Müller
Werner Münch
Joaquim Muns
Hemmo J. Muntingh
François Musso

N 

 Alessandro Natta
 
 Giovanni Negri
 Lore Neugebauer
 Stanley Newens
 Eddy Newman
 Bill Newton Dunn
 Jørgen Brøndlund Nielsen
 Tove Nielsen
 Egbert Nitsch
 Hans Nord
 Jean-Thomas Nordmann
 Sir Tom Normanton
 Wolfgang von Nostittz
 Diego Novelli

O 

Tom O'Donnell
Charles Strachey, 4th Baron O'Hagan

Christopher Gerard O'Malley
Jeanette Oppenheim

P 

Ian Paisley
Giancarlo Pajetta
Roger Palmieri
Marco Pannella
Konstantina Pantazi
Nikolaos Papakyriazis
Giovanni Papapietro
Christiane Papon
Christos Papoutsis
Eolo Parodi
Roger Partrat
Jean-Claude Pasty
George Benjamin Patterson
Andrew Pearce
Jorge Pegado
Jiří Pelikán
Jean J. M. Penders
Manuel Pereira
Virgílio Pereira
José Pereira Lopez
Fernando Pérez Royo
Luis Guillermo Perinat y Elío
Nicole Pery
Johannes Wilhelm Peters
Francesco Petronio
Gabriele Peus
Gero Pfennig
Pierre Pflimlin
Dorothee Piermont
Carlos Pimenta
Sergio Pininfarina
Maria de Lourdes Pintasilgo
Pedro Augusto Pinto
René-Emile Piquet
Fritz Pirkl
Ferruccio Pisoni
Nino Pisoni
Terry Pitt
Luis Planas
Spyridon Plaskovitis
The Lord Plumb
Hans Poetschki
Hans-Gert Pöttering
Lydie Polfer
Mario Pomilio
Michel C. Poniatowski
Bernard Pons
Josep Enric Pons Grau
Gustave A. Pordea
Lars Poulsen
Derek Prag
Pierre-Benjamin Pranchère
Peter N. Price
Christopher Prout, Baron Kingsland
James L. C. Provan
Alonso José Puerta
Eduardo Punset

Q 

 Joyce G. Quin

R 

Renate-Charlotte Rabbethge
Tom Raftery
Andrea Raggio
Juan de Dios Ramírez Heredia
Alfredo Reichlin
Marcel Gh. A. A. Remacle
Maria Dolors Renau
Mario Rigo
Günter Rinsche
Dame Shelagh Roberts
Carlos Robles Piquer
François M. G. A. Ch. F. Roelants du Vivier
Dieter Rogalla
Rosario Romeo
Georgios Romeos
Domènec Romera
Pino Romualdi
Yvonne M. C. Th. van Rooy
Walter Rosa
Giorgio Rossetti
André Rossi
Tommaso Rossi
Mechtild Rothe
Willi Rothley
Jean-Pierre Roux
Xavier Rubert
Richie Ryan

S 

Henri Saby
Bernhard Sälzer
Jannis Sakellariou
Heinke Salisch
Felipe Sanchez-Cuenca
Pedro Santana Lopes
Manuel dos Santos
Francisco Javier Sanz Fernández
Enrique Sapena Granell
Georgios Saridakis
Giuseppe Schiavinato
Dieter P. A. Schinzel
Ursula Schleicher
Gerhard Schmid
Barbara Schmidbauer
Lydie Schmit
Konrad Schön
Heinz Schreiber
Frank Schwalba-Hoth
James Scott-Hopkins
Christiane Scrivener
Barry H. Seal
Horst Seefeld
Hans-Joachim Seeler
Sergio Camillo Segre
Lieselotte Seibel-Emmerling
Madron Seligman
Gustavo Selva
Alexander Sherlock
Mateo Sierra
José Silva Domingos
Richard J. Simmonds
Barbara Simons
Anthony M. H. Simpson
Llewellyn T. Smith
Leopold Späth
Altiero Spinelli
Vera Squarcialupi
Paul M. J. Staes
Giovanni Starita
Franz-Ludwig Schenk Graf von Stauffenberg
Konstantinos Stavrou
George W. Stevenson
Kenneth A. Stewart
Sir Jack Stewart-Clark
Jean-Pierre Stirbois
Fernando Suárez
Georges Sutra

T 

John Taylor
Wilfried Telkämper
Bernard Thareau
Diemut R. Theato
Jacqueline Thome-Patenotre
Carlo Tognoli
Claus Toksvig
Teun Tolman
John Tomlinson, Baron Tomlinson
Carole Tongue
Günter Topmann
Enzo Tortora
Raymond Tourrain
Michel A. E. J. Toussaint
Giovanni Travaglini
Alberto Tridente
Antonino Tripodi
Renzo Trivelli
Osvalda Trupia
Frederick A. Tuckman
Amédée E. Turner
Ioannis Tzounis

U 

 Jakob von Uexkull
 Jef L. E. Ulburghs

V 

Maurizio Valenzi
José Valverde
Jaak H.-A. Vandemeulebroucke
Marijke J. H. van Hemeldonck
Jean-Marie Vanlerenberghe
Karel Van Miert
Peter B. R. Vanneck
Grigorios Varfis
Marie-Claude Vayssade
José Vázquez
Luis Vega Escandón
Simone Veil
Herman A. Verbeek
Josep Verde
Willem J. Vergeer
Paul Vergès
Jacques Vernier
Willy Vernimmen
Heinz Oskar Vetter
Nikolaos Vgenopoulos
Phili Viehoff
Ben Visser
Silvio Vitale
Kurt Vittinghoff
Thomas von der Vring

W 
Leen van der Waal
Manfred W. Wagner
Gerd Walter
Kurt Wawrzik
Beate Weber
Rudolf Wedekind
Michael J. Welsh
Charles Wendeling
Norman West
Klaus H. W. Wettig
Heidemarie Wieczorek-Zeul
Florus A. Wijsenbeek
Karl von Wogau
Joseph Wohlfart
Claude Wolff
Eisso P. Woltjer
Francis Wurtz

Z 

 Mario Zagari
 Hans-Jürgen Zahorka
 Axel N. Zarges
 Spyridon Zournatzis

See also
 1984 European Parliament election
 List of members of the European Parliament 1984–1989
 Member of the European Parliament